Lucas Arnold and Tomás Carbonell were the defending champions but only Arnold competed that year with Luis Lobo.

Arnold and Lobo lost in the first round to Gastón Etlis and Martín Rodríguez.

Etlis and Rodríguez won in the final 3–6, 6–3, [10–4] against Simon Aspelin and Andrew Kratzmann.

Seeds

  Simon Aspelin /  Andrew Kratzmann (final)
  Daniel Orsanic /  Sebastián Prieto (quarterfinals)
  Lucas Arnold /  Luis Lobo (first round)
  Johan Landsberg /  Jim Thomas (semifinals)

Draw

External links
 Copa AT&T Main Draw

ATP Buenos Aires
2002 ATP Tour
ATP